Dário Alberto Jesus Monteiro (born 27 February 1977), known simply as Dário, is a Mozambican retired footballer who played as a striker.

He spent most of his professional career in Portugal, amassing Primeira Liga totals of 138 games and 35 goals over the course of seven seasons, mainly at the service of Académica. Towards the end of his career, he played two years in South Africa.

Dário appeared with the Mozambique national team in two Africa Cup of Nations tournaments.

Playing career

Club career
Born in Maputo, Dário arrived in 1996 to Portugal from local Desportivo de Maputo, signing with Académica de Coimbra. After tentative starts he became one of the club's most important players, scoring goals in the Primeira Liga at an impressive rate – in his last five full seasons in his first spell, he only netted once in single digits and averaged 14 per campaign, always ranking high in the scoring charts.

Late into 2003, Dário earned himself a lucrative contract in the United Arab Emirates, joining Al-Jazira Club. Unsettled, he quickly returned to Portugal and Académica; in his only season in his second stint he only scored six times, but ranked first in his team, which barely avoided top flight relegation.

Dário also played with Vitória S.C. and C.F. Estrela da Amadora in Portugal, with very little impact, after which he left to Cyprus with Nea Salamis Famagusta FC. In the following year he moved countries again, successively representing in South Africa Supersport United F.C. and Mamelodi Sundowns FC.

In the summer of 2010, Dário was released by the Sundowns, stating he had offers from Angola and Greece. After any move failed to materialize he returned to his country and signed for reigning Moçambola champions Liga Muçulmana de Maputo, in late December.

International career
Dário played for Mozambique at the 1998 Africa Cup of Nations in Burkina Faso as the national team finished bottom of their group (losing every match in the process), and also appeared in the 2010 edition in Angola, helping the nation to the quarter-final stage. He totalled 40 caps and 16 goals, during 15 years.

International goals
Scores and results list Mozambique's goal tally first.

Coaching career

Dário is manager of Desportivo de Maputo and the Mozambique national under-20 football team.

References

External links

1977 births
Living people
Sportspeople from Maputo
Mozambican footballers
Association football forwards
GD Maputo players
Liga Desportiva de Maputo players
Primeira Liga players
Liga Portugal 2 players
Associação Académica de Coimbra – O.A.F. players
Vitória S.C. players
C.F. Estrela da Amadora players
Al Jazira Club players
Cypriot First Division players
Nea Salamis Famagusta FC players
Mamelodi Sundowns F.C. players
SuperSport United F.C. players
Mozambique international footballers
1998 African Cup of Nations players
2010 Africa Cup of Nations players
Mozambican expatriate footballers
Expatriate footballers in Portugal
Expatriate footballers in the United Arab Emirates
Expatriate footballers in Cyprus
Expatriate soccer players in South Africa
Mozambican expatriate sportspeople in Portugal
Mozambican expatriate sportspeople in Cyprus
Mozambican expatriate sportspeople in the United Arab Emirates
Mozambican expatriate sportspeople in South Africa
UAE Pro League players